Zoë Lister is an English actress and writer, known for portraying the role of Zoe Carpenter in the Channel 4 soap opera Hollyoaks. In 2014, she began working as a television writer, including work on Hollyoaks, The Lodge and Free Rein.

Television, Film and Stage

Zoe played the role of Zoe Carpenter in Hollyoaks from 2006 - 2010. She appeared as a guest on Big Brother's Little Brother and also presented at T4 On The Beach In 2009 she performed a Queen Medley on Children In Need alongside other Hollyoaks cast members. During 2010 Lister appeared in the play 'The Stanhope Sisters' as Kitty Dutton at The Red Hedgehog in Highgate, London. From 16 August 2010 until 4 December 2010 Zoe  toured the UK in the comedy play Teechers as Gail. She appeared as Lady Macbeth at the Liverpool Royal Court in 2012, a performance for which she received critical acclaim. Recently Zoe appeared in the feature film 'Brash Young Turks'. She is currently appearing as Mandy in a UK tour of 'Shady Business'.

With former Hollyoaks co-star Lena Kaur, Zoe has formed a comedy theatrical duo, 'Vicious Kitty' and the pair have performed original sketch comedy pieces at the Hen & Chickens in Islington and Leicester Square Theatre.

She is also starring in the new web series 'Staff Room', written and directed by Ry Mcdermott.

She will return to Hollyoaks reprising the role of Zoe in April 2017.

Personal life
On 19 August 2008 it was announced that Lister was to do the Great North Run to raise money for the Parkinson's Disease Society. Lister's grandmother was diagnosed with Parkinson's disease shortly before her death. The 13.1 mile run between Newcastle and South Shields took place on 5 October 2008.

In 2015, she married the musician Rob Castell.

Awards and nominations
In 2010 Lister won the British Soap Awards for the category of Spectacular Scene of the Year for "The Parachute Jump" scene, and in 2007 and 2008 she was Nominated for the category Sexiest Female at British Soap Awards

Contributions to Digital Modeling
In 2012 and 2013, Lister assisted researchers at Toshiba’s Cambridge Research Lab and the University of Cambridge’s Department of Engineering to develop "Zoe," a virtual "talking head" which can express a full range of human emotions.

References

External links

Profile  at E4
Profile at Spotlight
Profile at Twitter

English television actresses
English soap opera actresses
1982 births
Living people
People from Redditch
Butlins Redcoats